Arjun Kadhe (born 7 January 1994) is an Indian tennis player.

Kadhe has a career high ATP singles ranking of 328 achieved on 27 August 2018. He also has a career high ATP doubles ranking of 133 achieved on 26 September 2022. Kadhe has won 4 ITF Futures singles title. He has also won 3 challenger and 7 ITF Futures doubles titles.

Personal and early Life
Kadhe was born in Pune to Jayant and Rashmi Kadhe. His father supported him for playing tennis. He attended the Symbiosis College of Arts & Commerce before coming to OSU. He also got support from Maharashtra State Lawn Tennis Association (MSLTA) and Lakshya, a sports NGO. He finished his graduation from Oklahoma State University in 2017. During his tenure in Oklahoma Kadhe and his doubles partner Julian Cash became the first doubles team in Oklahoma State history to achieve the top spot in the Intercollegiate Tennis Association Rankings. The pair scripted 34 wins along with prestigious All-America honours at the NCAA Doubles Championship. Kadhe is coached by Hemant Bendrey.

Professional career
He appeared in each of the four Grand Slam tournaments at the junior level over the past two years. Kadhe won his first ITF singles title in November 2017 at Thu Dau Mot City in Vietnam.

He made his singles and doubles ATP World Tour debut at the 2018 Maharashtra Open. In singles, he lost in opening round to compatriot Yuki Bhambri. In doubles he paired with Frenchman Benoît Paire but lost in the first round.

Kadhe became the third Cowboy to ever earn three All-America honors. He compiled a team-high 34 doubles victories with partner Julian Cash. He clinched 20 singles wins primarily playing at the No. 2 position, including two wins over ranked opponents. He defeated seven ranked opponents in doubles with Cash, two of which came in the NCAA Doubles Tournament. He also won the Pacific Coast Doubles tournament in March while teaming with Cash and reached the quarterfinals of the ITA Central Regional during fall play. Currently sits in sixth place on OSU's career doubles wins list with 67.

Challenger and Futures/World Tennis Tour Finals

Singles: 8 (4-4)

Doubles: 9 (4–5)

References

External links

Arjun Kadhe at Oklahoma State University

1994 births
Living people
Indian male tennis players
Racket sportspeople from Pune
Oklahoma State Cowboys tennis players